The 1891–92 Welsh Amateur Cup was the second season of the Welsh Amateur Cup. The cup was won by Llandudno Swifts who defeated Wrexham Gymnasium 2-1 in the final.

First round

Replay

Second round

Replay

Third round

Fourth round

Semi-final

Final

References

1891-92
Welsh Cup
Wel